Daniela Druncea (born 2 November 1990) is a Romanian rowing coxswain and retired artistic gymnast. As a gymnast, she is a world bronze medalist with the team and was an alternate to the 2008 Romanian Olympic team. As a rower, she won a bronze medal at the 2016 Summer Olympics.

Druncea retired from gymnastics in 2009. She became a coxswain and won medals at the European championships, world championships and Olympic Games.

References

External links
 
 
 

1990 births
Living people
Romanian female artistic gymnasts
Medalists at the World Artistic Gymnastics Championships
Romanian female rowers
Coxswains (rowing)
World Rowing Championships medalists for Romania
Olympic bronze medalists for Romania
Medalists at the 2016 Summer Olympics
Olympic medalists in rowing
Rowers at the 2016 Summer Olympics
Olympic rowers of Romania
People from Buftea
Rowers at the 2020 Summer Olympics
21st-century Romanian women